Park Tower, formerly known as SGZ-Hochhaus, is a high-rise building in the Westend-Süd district of Frankfurt, Germany. It was built in 1972 as the administrative headquarters of the Südwestdeutschen Genossenschafts-Zentralbank (since 2001 DZ Bank). The then  building with a black-and-silver facade was briefly the tallest skyscraper in Frankfurt. It is located in Reuterweg near the Opernplatz and stands slightly oblique to the old opera house.

Between July 2005 and autumn 2007, the building was gutted completely and radically restructured. Following plans by the architects Albert Speer & Partner, it was increased by three levels and supplemented with a second block which lies down like a stone belt around the shaft of the tower. The new building is bright and dressed with natural stone, while the old building is completely glazed. The now  building offers approximately 24,000 square metres of gross floor area.

The main tenant of the building is the internationally active law firm Freshfields Bruckhaus Deringer, which has leased almost the entire building. The owner of the property is a property company of Dietz AG, Bensheim.

See also 
 List of tallest buildings in Frankfurt
 List of tallest buildings in Germany

References

Skyscrapers in Frankfurt
Skyscraper office buildings in Germany

Office buildings completed in 1972